"On and On and On" is a pop song recorded by Swedish pop group ABBA. It was released as a single in a limited number of countries in 1980 as the second single from their seventh studio album, Super Trouper.

Background 
The track, which had the working titles "Esses vad det svänger när man spelar jazz" (roughly translated as "God Almighty How it Swings When You're Playing Jazz") and "'Til the Night is Gone", was released as a single in a few countries, namely Argentina, Australia, Canada, France, Japan and the United States. The B-side in Australia and Japan was "The Piper"; in Argentina and Canada it was "Our Last Summer", and in the US it was "Lay All Your Love on Me"—all of which were also taken from the Super Trouper album.

"On and On and On" peaked at No. 9 in Australia, making it the 15th (and final) ABBA single to reach the Top 10 in that country. Although the song only managed to reach No. 90 on the US Billboard Hot 100 chart, its inclusion on a 12-inch single with the songs "Super Trouper" and "Lay All Your Love on Me" merits all three songs as having reached No. 1 on the American dance chart in May 1981.

An early mix of the song was used in the accompanying music video, but not released on record in stereo until 2011, and it features an extra verse:

"Standing up is scary if you think you're gonna fall /
Like a Humpty-Dumpty 'fraid of falling off your wall /
I say if you ever wanna know what's going on /
Gotta keep on rocking baby, 'till the night is gone..."

For the first time since ABBA made music videos, the clip for "On and On and On" did not feature any live movement from the group. Instead, a photo montage was made from their Las Vegas concert during their 1979 United States tour which attempted to match the action of the photos with the song.

The track is in the Mixolydian mode.

Record World said it was a "tasty, harmless, pop confection" and suggested that listeners "bounce, clap and smile along to [ABBA's] latest morsel."

Personnel
ABBA
 Agnetha Fältskog – lead and backing vocals
 Anni-Frid Lyngstad – lead and backing vocals
 Björn Ulvaeus – backing vocals
 Benny Andersson – backing vocals, piano, synthesizers
Additional personnel and production staff
 Janne Schaffer – guitar
 Rutger Gunnarsson – bass
 Ola Brunkert – drums
 Lars O. Carlsson, Katjek Wojciechowski, Jan Kling – saxophones

Charts

Weekly Charts

Year-end charts

Cover versions
 The song's chorus has a backing vocals arrangement clearly influenced by one of Benny Andersson's favourite bands, The Beach Boys, and in particular their 1968 hit "Do It Again". In 1981, Beach Boys member Mike Love returned the compliment by covering "On and On and On" on his solo album Looking Back with Love. It was also later included on the 1999 compilation ABBA: A Tribute – The 25th Anniversary Celebration.  Love re-recorded the song for his 2019 album  12 Sides of Summer.
 A French version was recorded as Ça va mal ("Things are bad") by Sylvie Vartan for her 1981 album of the same name.
 The 1992 compilation ABBA: The Tribute contained a cover by Swedish rock musician/singer Mats Ronander.
 The 1995 New Zealand compilation Abbasalutely contains a cover by Tall Dwarfs.
 The San Francisco Gay Men's Chorus recorded a cover of the song for their 1997 album ExtrABBAganza!.
 A eurodance cover by Italian act Raffa was released as a single in 1997.
 Almighty Records released several eurodance cover remixes of the song from the group Abbacadabra during the late 1990s. Various remixes can be found on the 2008 compilation We Love ABBA: The Mamma Mia Dance Compilation. Audio samples can be heard on the official Almighty Records website.

References

External links
 Single result
 ABBA 1980

1980 singles
ABBA songs
Polar Music singles
Songs written by Benny Andersson and Björn Ulvaeus
1980 songs